Se Canta (regional alternative titles: Se Chanta; Aqueras Montanhas) is an anthem associated with Occitania. It is also a very old popular song, known all over Occitania. According to legend, it was written by Gaston III Fébus (1331–1391), Count of Foix and Béarn.

Since 1993, it has an official status in Aran Valley (a comarca in Catalonia, Spain) with the title Montanhes Araneses. It has been the official anthem of Toulouse FC since August 6, 2010.

It is also popular in the High Aragon (Spain) with the name of Aqueras montanyas or Aqueras montañas, sung in Aragonese, with a similar lyrics. It was compiled by the Aragonese group Biella Nuei and later sung, among others, by the singer-songwriter José Antonio Labordeta.

Se Canta is often regarded as the unofficial anthem of all Occitania and most people living in that region know the words to the first verse and chorus even if they are not native Occitan speakers themselves.

Notable occasions on which it has been sung include the opening ceremony of the 2006 Winter Olympics in Turin on February 10, 2006 (by L'Ange Gardien Chorus), and in the French National Assembly on June 3, 2013 (by Jean Lassalle, in protest at a perceived slight on the Pyrenean village of Urdos by Minister of the Interior Nicolas Sarkozy).

Se Canta was commercially covered by a number of singers and bands, among which are Lou Dalfin, Patric, André Dassary, Charé Moulâ, Calabrun (from Germany), Jean-Bernard Plantevin, Coriandre, Tòni de l'Ostal, Biella Nuei (Aragón), Crestian Almergue e lo Grop Tèst, Corrou de Berra and Dorothée.

Lyrics
The lyrics of the song are in the Occitan language. The fourteen extant versions are all transcribed and translated in the following table. On February 9, 2002, the almond tree near the Nîmes fountain that is mentioned in several verses was replanted after its famous predecessor died. Although most texts are linked to the original Febusian poem, not all are: the shepherd and wedding versions, for instance, have different themes despite a common tune. Between brackets are the odd extra verses that can be heard but are not part of the regular lyrics.

References

External links 
 Video with translated lyrics
 With translated lyrics
  & (Occitan) Score, MIDI file, and lyrics

Se Canto
Regional songs
Se Canto
Se Canto
Occitan music
European anthems
National anthem compositions in F major
Medieval compositions
Anthems of non-sovereign states